Zhang Yanru  (born January 10, 1987) is a  Chinese football (soccer) player who competed in the 2008 Summer Olympics. Her position is that of goalkeeper.

Zhang played in the U-20's China team until 2007, when she received her first call up to the China team proper. She played two of the four matches, including the quarter-final, in that year's World Cup. She also competed in the 2008 Beijing Olympics, which are open to all ages for the female squads.

References

External links
Profile at FIFA.com

1987 births
Living people
Chinese women's footballers
China women's international footballers
Footballers at the 2008 Summer Olympics
Olympic footballers of China
2007 FIFA Women's World Cup players
Women's association football goalkeepers
Asian Games medalists in football
Footballers at the 2006 Asian Games
Footballers at the 2010 Asian Games
Asian Games bronze medalists for China
Sportspeople from Xuzhou
Medalists at the 2006 Asian Games
21st-century Chinese women